The Kaimarama River is a river of New Zealand's Coromandel Peninsula. It flows from its source within Coromandel Forest Park, joining with the Mahakirau River to flow into Whitianga Harbour on the peninsula's east coast.

See also
List of rivers of New Zealand

References

Thames-Coromandel District
Rivers of Waikato
Rivers of New Zealand